Pimpalgaon Joge Dam, is an earthfill dam on Ar Pushpavati river, a tributary of Kukadi River near Junnar, Pune district in the state of Maharashtra in India.

Specifications
The dam is located in the Ghod basin and is part of the Kukadi project, which constructed five dams in the region. Other dams included in this project are Yedgaon Dam, Manikdoh Dam, Dimbhe Dam and Wadaj Dam. As of 2010, the annual average rainfall in the catchment area of this dam was 900 mm.

Purpose
 Irrigation
The dam provides water to areas of Otur, Junnar, Narayangaon, Alephata and Parner, which are basically grape harvesting areas.

See also
 Dams in Maharashtra
 List of reservoirs and dams in India

References

Dams in Pune district
Dams completed in 1999
1999 establishments in Maharashtra
20th-century architecture in India